The Pi Glilot bombing was an attempt by a Palestinian terrorist to cause a massive explosion in the Pi Glilot LPG depot north of Tel Aviv, Israel. It occurred on May 23, 2002. The attempt was foiled with no injuries, but if it had succeeded, it could have killed thousands of people in a massive fireball.

The attack 
On Thursday, May 23, 2002, Israeli truck driver Yitzhak Ginsburg drove a tanker truck into the Pi Glilot gas depot, and pulled up next to eight other parked fuel tankers. As the truck was being filled with diesel, a bomb on the underside of the truck was detonated, causing the truck to rupture and catch fire. Ginsburg was thrown from the vehicle but was not injured. Safety workers at the facility put out the fire using sprinkler systems.

Israeli police stated that the bomb had been placed on the truck by a Palestinian terrorist while the truck was parked overnight in a publicly accessible lot near the facility. He waited for the truck to be refueled, then detonated the bomb using a remote-control device, possibly a mobile phone. According to investigators, the terrorist watched the tanker from a nearby vantage point.

Israeli officials said that if the plot had succeeded, the fire would have spread to nearby gas tanks stored in the Pi Glilot facility, which held about 3,000 tons of gas and 80 million liters of fuel. This would have sparked a chain reaction, resulting in an explosion that would create a shock wave powerful enough to destroy cars and buildings in the area, and a massive fireball that would have consumed everything within a radius of several kilometers. The results would have been devastating due to the Pi Glilot depot's location. The depot was located in Herzliya, north of the upscale Tel Aviv neighborhood of Ramat Aviv and near the city of Ramat HaSharon. The depot also stood next to the Glilot Junction on Highway 2, one of Israel's busiest traffic arteries. The headquarters of Mossad, Shin Bet, and Israeli Military Intelligence are located at the Glilot Junction. If the truck had been carrying a more volatile fuel than diesel such as gasoline, disaster would have been more likely. Police estimated that the attack would have killed 10,000 people.

Aftermath 
Before the attack, several attempts were made to find a suitable place to relocate the Pi Glilot facility away from a densely populated area. These attempts were blocked by local governments who did not want the gas depot to be built in their jurisdictions.

The Pi Glilot was one of many attacks in May 2002 as part of the Second Intifada.  A suicide bomber attacked a crowded city center in Rishon LeZion that same evening of May 23 at 9:30 PM. The attack was one of a series of attempted mega-attacks, designed to cause massive loss of life. Another example of such an attempt was a 2003 plot to attack the Azrieli Towers in Tel Aviv with a 1,000-kilogram bomb, which was foiled by Israeli security services.

After the attack, operations at the Pi Glilot facility were suspended. The government demanded that the facility be shut down within 90 days, but changed its mind and allowed it to remain open until 2004.

This incident occurred two weeks after the end of Operation Defensive Shield, a military operation by the Israel Defense Forces to combat Palestinian terrorist groups, by carrying out raids, such as during the Battle of Jenin and the Siege of the Church of the Nativity, in the West Bank.

In the immediate aftermath, no Palestinian organization claimed responsibility for the attack. Later, in November 2002, the Shin Bet found a Hamas group that was responsible for the Pi Glilot bombing and other attacks. Three members of a Hamas cell in Jerusalem that orchestrated the Pi Glilot attack were given life sentences for other attacks that killed 35 people.

References

Further reading 
Pi Glilot bombing search results on Google News

Terrorist attacks attributed to Palestinian militant groups
Terrorist incidents in Israel in 2002
May 2002 events in Asia
Islamic terrorism in Israel